The Benjamin Godfrey Memorial Chapel is a historic chapel located on the campus of Lewis and Clark Community College in Godfrey, Illinois, named for school and town founder Benjamin Godfrey. The chapel was built in 1854 to serve the Church of Christ, a church formed by three Christian denominations at the Monticello Female Seminary. The Greek Revival chapel has a raised temple front with six Doric columns supporting a pediment; a Gothic steeple rises above the entrance. The Historic American Buildings Survey documented the church in 1934 and named it one of the six most representative New England-style churches built outside of New England. Monticello Female Seminary, later known as Monticello College, used the chapel for daily religious services, convocation and commencement ceremonies, and student productions and performances. In 1971, Monticello College closed, and Lewis and Clark Community College took over its campus.

The chapel was added to the National Register of Historic Places on May 10, 1979.

References

Properties of religious function on the National Register of Historic Places in Illinois
Greek Revival church buildings in Illinois
Religious buildings and structures completed in 1854
National Register of Historic Places in Madison County, Illinois
Buildings and structures in Madison County, Illinois
1854 establishments in Illinois